The Anzali Operation was a naval and amphibious action carried by the Caspian Flotilla during the Russian Civil War.



Background 
The Russian Civil War in Caspian Sea saw previous confrontation between the Soviet Russian Caspian Flotilla against the British Caspian Flotilla, the latter supporting the White movement as part of the Allied intervention. British scored a victory during the Battle of Alexandrovsky Fort, but the harbor was reconquered in April 1920. Royal Navy officially passed the entire flotilla to the White movement on 2 September 1919.

Action 
The Soviet Russian Caspian Flotilla gathered a considerable force to attack Anzali.
The task force was composed of four auxiliary cruisers (Proletariy, Rosa Luxemburg, Pushkin, Bela Kun), four destroyers (Karl Liebknecht, Delnyi, Deyatelnyi, Rastoropnyi), two gunboats (Kars and Ardagan) the transport Gretsiya and other minor units. 
Complete surprise was achieved, a naval shelling in early morning nearly hit the main British headquarters.

No organized defense was attempted, while the Persian governor formally accepted the Soviet Russian presence, the White detachment fled the city on ground and the entire flotilla was seized without resistance.
Seized ships included: auxiliary cruisers President Kruger, America, Europe, Africa, Dmitry Donskoy, Asia, Slava, Mylutin, Opyt and Merkur, the motor-torpedo-boat carrier (previously seaplane carrier) Orlenok, the seaplane-carrier (previously m.t.b. carrier) Volga, four seaplanes, four motor torpedo boats (former British), ten merchants, a number of support, auxiliary and minor units in addition to large amount of supplies and ammunition.

Aftermath 
The Anzali Operation marked the ending of the Russian Civil War naval confrontation on Caspian Sea. 
 
The action also established the short-lived Persian Socialist Soviet Republic, with little British resistance, while a detachment of 800 Cossacks surrendered to the Soviets and Persian communists "Jangalis".

References

Allied intervention in the Russian Civil War
Battles of the Russian Civil War
Naval battles involving Russia
Naval battles of the Russian Civil War
Naval battles involving the United Kingdom